Jake Keough (born June 18, 1987 in Sandwich, Massachusetts) is a former American cyclist.

Major results

2008
8th stage International Cycling Classic
2nd Univest Grand Prix
2009
1st, 3rd and 4th stages Vuelta Ciclista del Uruguay
3rd United States National Criterium Championships
2010
1st Crystal Cup
2011
1st Crystal Cup
2nd stage Nature Valley Grand Prix
3rd United States National Criterium Championships
2012
1st Crystal Cup
4th stage Tour of Utah
2013
13th stage Tour of Qinghai Lake
10th stage Volta a Portugal

References

1987 births
Living people
American male cyclists